Vinícius de Oliveira (born July 18, 1985) is a Brazilian actor.

Biography
Vinícius Campos de Oliveira was born on July 18, 1985 in Bonsucesso, Rio de Janeiro. He was raised by his mother, Juçara, along with an older brother and two younger sisters; Vinícius and his brother would shine shoes to make ends meet, and it was while shining shoes that de Oliveira met director Walter Salles, who would invite him to a screen test for a role in his upcoming film.

Career
In 1997, de Oliveira selected from among almost 2,000 candidates to play the role of Josué in Salles’ Central Station alongside Fernanda Montenegro. The film was critically acclaimed and launched de Oliveira into a career as a child actor, presenting such programs as “"Alô Vídeo Escola" and "Que bicho é esse?" on Canal Futura between June 1998 and March 2000. He also starred in the telenovela Suave Veneno on Globo TV and reunited with Walter Salles to perform in the film Behind the Sun during this period.

De Oliveira began to break into theater around this time, performing in a production of Carlos Drummond de Andrade’s Jovem Drummond, which debuted in November 2000 and toured the country, and Marcus Vinícius Faustini’s São Paulo production of They Do Not Wear Black-Tie between March and May 2001. He appeared in the Caixa Preta Group’s production of Anamaria Nunes’ The Trianon Generation in 2004.

In 2008, de Oliveira starred in Walter Salles and Daniela Thomas’ Linha de Passe, which was nominated for the Palme d’Or at that year’s Cannes Film Festival. He also had a role in the 2015 film Neon Bull, which was highly acclaimed and won the Grand Prix at the 31st Warsaw International Film Festival and the Horizons Special Jury Prize at the 72nd Venice International Film Festival.

Filmography

Film

Television

References

External links
Official website
 

Brazilian male actors
1985 births
Living people
Male actors from Rio de Janeiro (city)
Pontifical Catholic University of Rio de Janeiro alumni